Cetrimonium chloride, or cetyltrimethylammonium chloride (CTAC), is a topical antiseptic and surfactant. Long-chain quaternary ammonium surfactants, such as cetyltrimethylammonium chloride (CTAC), are generally combined with long-chain fatty alcohols, such as stearyl alcohols, in formulations of hair conditioners and shampoos. The cationic surfactant concentration in conditioners is generally of the order of 1–2% and the alcohol concentrations are usually equal to or greater than those of the cationic surfactants. The ternary system, surfactant/fatty alcohol/water, leads to a lamellar structure forming a percolated network giving rise to a gel.

See also
Behentrimonium chloride – an C25 structural analogue
Cetrimonium bromide – the corresponding bromide salt

References

Antiseptics
Chlorides
Quaternary ammonium compounds
Cationic surfactants